The Supercopa de España de Baloncesto 2009 was held on 2–3 October in the Centro Insular de Deportes arena in Las Palmas. FC Barcelona won their third title.

Qualified teams

Semifinals

Final

See also
 Supercopa de España de Baloncesto
 ACB

References

External links
 Official Website
 Horarios de la Supercopa ACB

Supercopa de España de Baloncesto
2009–10 in Spanish basketball cups